Fiat Lux (Latin, 'Let there be light'), comes from third verse of the Book of Genesis.

Fiat Lux may also refer to:
Fiat Lux (band), a 1980s English synthpop band
"Fiat Lux", a poem by Lynda Hull
Fiat Lux, a science fiction novella by Walter M. Miller, Jr.
Fiat Lux (UFO religion), a cult based in Germany
 Fiat Lux (film), a 1923 Austrian film

See also
Let There Be Light (disambiguation)